The Minnesota Vikings are a professional American football team based in Minneapolis. They are members of the North Division of the National Football Conference (NFC) in the National Football League (NFL). A franchise was granted to Minneapolis businessmen Bill Boyer, H. P. Skoglund and Max Winter in 1959 as a member of the American Football League (AFL). The ownership forfeited their AFL membership in January 1960 and received the National Football League's 14th franchise on January 28, 1960 that started play in 1961.

The Vikings have had 39 starting quarterbacks in the history of their franchise; they have never had more than three starting quarterbacks in one season. The Vikings' past starting quarterbacks include Pro Football Hall of Fame inductees Fran Tarkenton, Brett Favre and Warren Moon. The team's first starting quarterback was George Shaw; he was replaced by Tarkenton in the franchise's first game, and the future Hall of Famer retained the starting role for most of the remainder of the season. Kirk Cousins has been Minnesota's starting quarterback since 2018.

History

The Vikings' starting quarterback for the first game of their inaugural season against the Chicago Bears was George Shaw. However, he was replaced by Fran Tarkenton early on, who passed for four touchdowns in the game and rushed for one more. Tarkenton went on to start in 10 of the Vikings' 14 regular season matches that year. He played for the Vikings until 1967, when he was traded to the New York Giants, and Joe Kapp took his place as the Vikings' starting quarterback . Kapp led the Vikings to their first playoff appearance in 1968, but he was traded to the Boston Patriots in 1970 and Gary Cuozzo stepped up to replace him. Cuozzo remained in the position for two seasons, moving to the St. Louis Cardinals in 1972.

Tarkenton returned for another seven-year spell as the Vikings' starting quarterback in 1972, continuing until his retirement in 1978, at which point Tommy Kramer was promoted from the second string in his second season with the franchise. Kramer was injured for most of the 1983 season, so Steve Dils served as the starting quarterback for most of the season, before Kramer reclaimed the position in 1984. For the 1987 season, Kramer shared quarterback duties with Wade Wilson, before Wilson took over on a permanent basis from 1988. Wilson was replaced by the emerging Rich Gannon in 1990, but Gannon was released after the 1992 season and veteran Jim McMahon took over for the 1993 season until the arrival of Warren Moon in 1994.

Moon retained the starting quarterback spot for two seasons, but suffered a broken collarbone halfway through his third season with the Vikings and was replaced by Brad Johnson for the remainder of the season. The Vikings had three starting quarterbacks in the following three seasons – Johnson (1997), Randall Cunningham (1998) and Jeff George (1999) – before Daunte Culpepper began a six-year spell in his second year in the NFL in 2000. He suffered a serious knee injury during the 2005 season, and Johnson took over in the position again, having re-signed the previous summer after seven years away from the franchise. Culpepper then joined the Miami Dolphins in 2006, giving Johnson another full year as starting quarterback, only to be replaced by sophomore Tarvaris Jackson in 2007. The 2008 season commenced with Jackson starting at quarterback, but he was replaced after two games by Gus Frerotte, who was returning to the Vikings from the St. Louis Rams after having been traded to the Miami Dolphins in 2005. Jackson regained the job for the final three games and led the Vikings to their first divisional title since 2000, and their first NFC North title.

In 2009, the Vikings recruited veteran quarterback Brett Favre out of retirement to be their new starting quarterback. In Week 13 of the 2010 season, Favre suffered a chest injury that ended his NFL-record streak of consecutive starts at 297 (321 including postseason games), and Tarvaris Jackson reclaimed the starting spot for Week 14. However, Jackson was injured himself in Week 15, giving rookie Joe Webb a chance to stake a claim for the position. He was unable to hold onto the position as Donovan McNabb was signed as a free agent to replace Favre, who retired at the end of the 2010 season. After going 1–5 through the first six games of 2011, though, McNabb was replaced by first-round draft pick Christian Ponder, who retained the starting position for the remainder of the season and for the whole of 2012. However, he was plagued by indifferent form and the Vikings signed Matt Cassel – recently released by the Kansas City Chiefs. When Ponder suffered an injury early in the 2013 season, Cassel was given his first start for the Vikings in week 4 in the NFL International Series game against the Pittsburgh Steelers at Wembley Stadium, London. He started the following game, but was replaced in week 7 by Josh Freeman, recently signed after his release by the Tampa Bay Buccaneers. However, he was injured during the game and did not make another start for the Vikings, allowing Ponder to reclaim the starting role. Cassel then returned as the starter in week 14, and retained the role for the rest of the season and into 2014. After three games, he was placed on injured reserve and first-round draft pick Teddy Bridgewater took over for the week 4 game against the Atlanta Falcons. Bridgewater himself was injured late in the game, allowing Ponder the chance to come back in for the following week, but the rookie soon returned and has held the starting berth until suffering a knee injury in practice during the 2016 preseason. Shaun Hill started the season opener and Sam Bradford took over in week 2. Ahead of the 2018 season, the Vikings signed free agent quarterback Kirk Cousins from the Washington Redskins on a three-year, fully guaranteed $84 million contract. He started 31 consecutive regular season games to start his Vikings career before sitting out the final game of 2019 with the team's playoff berth already secured; Sean Mannion started in his place.

Seven Vikings quarterbacks have made at least one start in their rookie season: Tarkenton in 1961, Vander Kelen in 1963, Kramer in 1977, Jackson in 2006, Webb in 2010, Ponder in 2011 and Bridgewater in 2014.

Starting quarterbacks by season

Regular season

Postseason

Statistics
Having been the franchise's starting quarterback for 13 seasons (longer than any other Vikings player), Fran Tarkenton holds the record for the most starts in a Vikings jersey, and those for the most wins and ties. He is also the franchise's leading passer in terms of numbers of attempts, completions, total yards gained and passing touchdowns, although Brett Favre has the best pass completion percentage. However, Tarkenton has also thrown the most interceptions. The record for the longest completed pass by a Vikings starting quarterback is held by Gus Frerotte, who threw a 99-yard touchdown pass to wide receiver Bernard Berrian in a home game against the Chicago Bears in the 2008 season.

Tarkenton is also the franchise leader for rushing attempts and rushing yards as a quarterback, but it is Daunte Culpepper – with 72 fewer rushing yards on 10 fewer attempts than Tarkenton – who has the most rushing touchdowns. Joe Webb holds the record for the longest rush with a 65-yard run in Minnesota's 34–28 road loss to the Detroit Lions in 2011.

* Statistics accurate as of the end of Week 18 of the 2022 season.
Bold text indicates the player is currently on the Vikings roster

See also
List of Minnesota Vikings first-round draft picks

Notes
 In each game, a team picks one player to start in the quarterback position. Players may be substituted during the game, but the term "starting quarterback" refers to the player who started the game in that position.
 Since the 1978 NFL season, all teams have played 16-game schedules.
 Strikes by the National Football League Players Association in the 1982 and 1987 seasons resulted in shortened seasons (9- and 15-game schedules, respectively).

References
General

Specific

Minnesota Vikings
 
Quarterbacks